The Woman Dressed As a Man (French: La femme en homme) is a 1932 French comedy film directed by Augusto Genina and starring Carmen Boni, Armand Bernard and André Dubosc.

It was based on a 1925 play by Ugo Falena which had previously been adapted into the 1926 silent film The Last Lord and was remade in 1945 as The Twentieth Duke.

The film's sets were designed by the art director Lazare Meerson.

Cast
 Carmen Boni as Claude
 Armand Bernard as M. Gray
 André Dubosc as Le duc de Bressy
 Françoise Rosay as Princesse Marie 
 Alex Bernard 
 Pedro Elviro 
 Bernard Koowost 
 Victor Vina

References

Bibliography 
 Andrews, Dudley. Mists of Regret: Culture and Sensibility in Classic French Film. Princeton University Press, 1995.

External links 
 

1932 comedy films
French comedy films
1932 films
1930s French-language films
Films directed by Augusto Genina
Remakes of French films
Sound film remakes of silent films
French black-and-white films
1930s French films